Heinrich von Siegburg was a twelfth century Bishop of Poznań in Poland, he was little known for his career or episcopal work but was active under the rule of Bolesław III Wrymouth.

A German, his home monastery was Michaelsberg Abbey, Siegburg, where he was for a time chaplain to Anno II, Archbishop of Cologne.

According to Gerard Labuda he is the "abbot" in the Life of Saint Henry who was familiar with Otto of Bamberg. At any rate Heinrich arrived in Poland from Germany with Otto about 1080 and became Bishop of Poznań in 1103.

Heinrich died on 8 July in either 1105 or 1109.

References 

Bishops of Poznań
11th-century births
1109 deaths
12th-century Roman Catholic bishops in Poland